Decatur County is the name of various past and present counties in the United States, all named for Stephen Decatur:

Decatur County, Georgia
Decatur County, Indiana
Decatur County, Iowa
Decatur County, Kansas
Decatur County, Tennessee
Decatur County, Alabama, a former county
Decatur County, Missouri, a previous name for Ozark County, Missouri